Loic Wakanumuné (born 27 March 1985) is a New Caledonian footballer who plays as a defender for AS Magenta in the New Caledonia Super Ligue.

References

1985 births
Living people
New Caledonian footballers
AS Magenta players
AS Mont-Dore players
Gaïtcha FCN players
2016 OFC Nations Cup players
Association football defenders
New Caledonia international footballers